The Dráp Niflunga is a short prose section in the Poetic Edda between Helreið Brynhildar and Guðrúnarkviða II. Henry Adams Bellows notes in his commentary that the purpose of the section is to serve as a narrative link between the poems.

In the preceding sections, both Sigurd and Brynhildr have died and this section deals with how Brynhild's brother Atli becomes Gudrun's second husband and with how Atli avenges Brynhild's death by slaying Gudrun's brothers Gunnar and Hogni.

Storyline
This is Henry Adams Bellows' translation of the section:

Notes

References
 The Slaying of The Niflungs Henry Adams Bellows' translation and commentary
 The Slaughter of the Niflungs Benjamin Thorpe's translation
 The Fall of the Niflungs Lee M. Hollander's translation
 Dráp Niflunga Sophus Bugge's edition of the manuscript text
 Dráp Niflunga Guðni Jónsson's edition with normalized spelling

Eddic poetry
Sources of Norse mythology
Nibelung tradition
Völsung cycle